The  is the official anthem of Madeira, an autonomous North Atlantic archipelago of Portugal. It was adopted in 1980, through Regional Decree 12/80/M of September 16. The lyrics are by Ornelas Teixeira and the music by João Víctor Costa.

The anthem is performed at official ceremonies, such as flag salutes or for the President of the Legislative Assembly or the Regional Government.

History 
The anthem was composed by João Víctor Costa (1939–2018), who was a composer and tenor from Estreito de Câmara de Lobos, on southern Madeira Island. Victor Costa studied singing and piano at the Diocesan Seminary of Funchal and the Academy of Music and Arts of Madeira. He later got a scholarship at the Calouste Gulbenkian Foundation and went to Munich, Germany. He composed hundreds of pieces, including 16 hymns and more than 100 classical songs, and created nine choirs. He was honoured by Câmara de Lobos City Council, Madeira's Conservatory of Music and Funchal City Hall in 2011, 2015 and 2016, respectively.

Lyrics

Notes

References

External links
Instrumental version

National symbols of Portugal
Portuguese-language songs
Portuguese anthems
Regional songs
1980 songs